The Forerunner Stakes was an American Thoroughbred horse race run annually from 1950 through 2007 at Keeneland Race Course in Lexington, Kentucky. Open to three-year-old horses, it was last contested on turf over a distance of one and one-eighth miles (9 furlongs).

Historical notes
The Forerunner Stakes was contested at a distance of seven furlongs from its inception in 1950 through 1985. From 1986 through 1988 it was raced at 1 1/16 miles and from 1989 through 2007, at 1 1/8 miles. The event was raced as an overnight allowance from 1950-1985. It became a Listed race in 1986 before being upgraded to a Grade 3 event in 1988. In 1999, it returned to Listed status.

From 1996 thru its final running in 2007, the Forerunner offered a purse of $100,000. As recently as 2002, it was listed as an official Triple Crown Prep Race. 

Your Host, owned by Hollywood film producer and studio executive William Goetz, won the 1950 inaugural Forerunner Purse. Ridden by future Hall of Fame inductee Johnny Longden, Your Host  broke the Keeneland track record for seven furlongs on dirt with a time of 1:22 2/5. Retired to stud, Your Host most notably sired  the legendary Kelso, a Hall of Fame inductee who won American Horse of the Year honors five straight times from 1960 thru 1964.

In 1959, Tomy Lee also won the race in another track record time of 1:21 3/5 for seven furlongs on dirt. Tomy Lee then won Keeneland's Blue Grass Stakes and the 1959 Kentucky Derby.

Records
Speed  record:
 1:47 1/5 @ 1-1/8 miles (9 furlongs): Rough Opening (1996)
 1:21 2/5 @ 7 furlongs: John Washington (1977)

Most wins by a jockey:
 4 - Bill Shoemaker (1959, 1960, 1964, 1982)

Most wins by a trainer:
 3 - Jimmy Jones (1956, 1957, 1958)
 3 - Woody Stephens (1963, 1984, 1988)

Most wins by an owner:
 4 - Cain Hoy Stable (1955, 1963, 1968, 1969)

Winners

References

Discontinued horse races
Turf races in the United States
Ungraded stakes races in the United States
Previously graded stakes races in the United States
Flat horse races for three-year-olds
Recurring sporting events established in 1950
Recurring sporting events disestablished in 2007
Keeneland